Brunswick is a town in Cumberland County, Maine, United States. The population was 21,756 at the 2020 United States Census. Part of the Portland-South Portland-Biddeford metropolitan area, Brunswick is home to Bowdoin College, the Bowdoin International Music Festival, the Bowdoin College Museum of Art, the Peary–MacMillan Arctic Museum, and the Maine State Music Theatre. It was formerly home to the U.S. Naval Air Station Brunswick, which was permanently closed on May 31, 2011, and has since been partially released to redevelopment as "Brunswick Landing".

History

Settled in 1628 by Thomas Purchase and other fishermen, the area was called by its Indian name, Pejepscot, meaning "the long, rocky rapids part [of the river]". In 1639, Purchase placed his settlement under protection of the Massachusetts Bay Colony. During King Philip's War in 1676, Pejepscot was burned and abandoned, although a garrison called Fort Andros was built on the ruins during King William's War. During the war, in Major Benjamin Church's second expedition a year later, he arrived on September 11, 1690, with 300 men at Casco Bay. He went up the Androscoggin River to Fort Pejepscot (present day Brunswick, Maine). From there he went  up-river and attacked a native village. Three or four native men were shot in retreat. When Church discovered five captive settlers in the wigwams, six or seven prisoners were butchered as an example, and nine prisoners were taken. A few days later, in retaliation, the natives attacked Church at Cape Elizabeth on Purpooduc Point, killing seven of his men and wounding 24 others. On September 26, Church returned to Portsmouth, New Hampshire.

The 1713 Treaty of Portsmouth brought peace to the region between the Abenaki Indians and the English colonists.

In 1714, a consortium from Boston and Portsmouth bought the land, thereafter called the Pejepscot Purchase. The Massachusetts General Court constituted the township in 1717, naming it "Brunswick" in honor of the House of Brunswick and its scion, King George I. A stone fort called Fort George was built in 1715 near the falls. But during Dummer's War on July 13, 1722, Abenaki warriors from Norridgewock burned the village. Consequently, Governor Samuel Shute declared war on the Abenakis. In 1724, 208 English colonial militia left Fort Richmond and sacked Norridgewock during Dummer's War. Brunswick was rebuilt again in 1727, and in 1739 incorporated as a town. It became a prosperous seaport, where Bowdoin College was chartered in 1794.

Brunswick became a major producer of lumber, with as many as 25 sawmills. Some of the lumber went into shipbuilding. Other firms produced paper, soap, flour, marble and granite work, carriages and harness, plows, furniture, shoes and confections. The town was site of the first cotton mill in Maine, the Brunswick Cotton Manufactory Company, built in 1809 to make yarn. Purchased in 1812, the mill was enlarged by the Maine Cotton & Woolen Factory Company. In 1857, the Cabot Manufacturing Company was established to make cotton textiles. It bought the failed Worumbo Mill and expanded the brick factory along the falls. Needing even more room, the company in 1890 persuaded the town to move Maine Street.

Today, Brunswick has a number of historic districts recognized on the National Register of Historic Places, including the Pennellville Historic District preserving shipbuilders' and sea captains' mansions built in the Federal, Greek Revival and Italianate architectural styles. Principal employers for Brunswick include L.L. Bean, Bath Iron Works, as well as companies that produce fiberglass construction material and electrical switches. A number of health services providers serving Maine's mid-coast area are located in Brunswick. The former Naval Air Station Brunswick was a major employer in Brunswick prior to its closure.

In popular culture
The book Uncle Tom's Cabin was written by Harriet Beecher Stowe while she was living in Brunswick, during the time that her husband was a professor at Bowdoin. She got a key vision for the book in the First Parish Church.

A scene in the 1993 movie The Man Without a Face was filmed in the town.

Geography
Brunswick is located at the north end of Casco Bay, as well as the head of tide and head of navigation on the Androscoggin River.

Climate

Neighboring cities and towns

Demographics

As of 2000, the median income for a household in the town was $40,402; and the median income for a family was $49,088. Males had a median income of $32,141 versus $24,927 for females. The per capita income for the town was $20,322. About 5.0% of families and 8.0% of the population were below the poverty line, including 8.6% of those under age 18 and 8.1% of those age 65 or over.

2010 census
As of the census of 2010, there were 15,175 people, 7,183 households, and 6,498 families residing in the census-designated place of Brunswick. The racial makeup of the town was 93.0% White, 1.7% African American, 0.3% Native American, 2.1% Asian, 0.5% from other races, and 2.4% from two or more races. Hispanic or Latino of any race were 2.9% of the population.

There were 8,469 households, of which 25.7% had children under the age of 18 living with them; 44.7% were married couples living together; 9.7% had a female householder with no husband present; 3.3% had a male householder with no wife present; and 42.3% were non-families. 35.1% of all households were made up of individuals, and 16.5% had someone living alone who was 65 years of age or older. The average household size was 2.19 and the average family size was 2.83.

The median age in the town was 41.4 years. 19.2% of residents were under the age of 18; 14.1% were between the ages of 18 and 24; 20.8% were from 25 to 44; 27.6% were from 45 to 64; and 18.2% were 65 years of age or older. The gender makeup of the town was 47.1% male and 52.9% female.

Education

The Brunswick School Department operates the town's public schools, including:
 Brunswick High School
Brunswick Junior High School 
Kate Furbish Elementary School 
Harriet Beecher Stowe Elementary School
REAL School 
Region 10 Technical High School 
Other local educational institutions include:
 Children's School of Arts & Science
 Saint John's Catholic School
 Bowdoin College
 Southern Maine Community College Midcoast Campus
The Growstown School, on Woodside Road, is the last remaining of the town's formerly twenty-six one-room schoolhouses.

Sites of interest

 Androscoggin Pedestrian Swinging Bridge
 Bowdoin College Museum of Art
 Pejepscot Historical Society
 Pejepscot Museum
 Joshua L. Chamberlain Museum
 Skolfield-Whittier House

Infrastructure

Transportation
The town is served by Interstate 295, U.S. Routes 1 and 201, and Maine State Route 24, Maine State Route 123 and Maine State Route 196.

Amtrak's Downeaster train service terminates at Brunswick Maine Street Station and connects the town to the Portland Transportation Center and Boston's North Station.

Metro Greater Portland Transit District provides several trips a day between the Portland Transportation Center and Brunswick Maine Street Station with its Metro Breez bus service.

Notable people 

 John Stevens Cabot Abbott, clergyman and author
Dale Arnold, sportscaster, co-host of the WEEI-FM Dale & Holley (with Keefe) Show and the Boston Bruins pre and postgame shows on NESN; resided in Brunswick 
 Fanny Chamberlain, wife of Joshua Chamberlain
 Joshua Chamberlain, Civil War–era general and 32nd governor of Maine
 Walter Christie, author
 Robert P. T. Coffin, poet
 Alexander Cornell du Houx, state legislator
 Scott Cowger, state legislator
 Elizabeth W. Crandall, environmental and women's rights activist
 Robert L. Dale, Pilot in Antarctica, Dale Glacier namesake
 Robert P. Dunlap, congressman, 11th governor of Maine
 Charles Carroll Everett, theologian
 Stanley Gerzofsky, state legislator
 John Gould, reporter, columnist
 Frederic Aldin Hall, professor, school chancellor
 Joshua Herrick, congressman
 Graeme K., musician
 Angus King, U.S. Senator, 72nd governor of Maine
 Lady Lamb, musician
 Henry Wadsworth Longfellow, poet
 Cynthia Lord, children's author
 Stump Merrill, baseball player
 Karen Mills, Administrator of Small Business Administration, cabinet-level position
 Ralph Mims, basketball player
 Benjamin Orr, congressman
 Alpheus Spring Packard, professor
 George Palmer Putnam, publisher
 Luke Rathborne, musician
 John Rankin Rogers, third Governor of the state of Washington
 Mark Rogers, pitcher for the Milwaukee Brewers
 Patricia E. Ryan, human rights advocate and women's rights lobbyist
 Arthur A. Small, Iowa state legislator and lawyer
 Harriet Beecher Stowe, abolitionist, author
 Brigadier Samuel Thompson, Revolutionary War soldier
 Grant Tremblay, astrophysicist 
 Dan Walters, baseball player and police officer
 Robert Zildjian, founder of Sabian cymbals

References

Further reading

 History of the Town Commons, Brunswick, Maine
  History of Brunswick, Topsham, and Harpswell, Maine Including Ancient Pejebscot. By George Augustus Wheeler and Henry Warren Wheeler. Published 1878. Full image at books.google.

External links

 Town of Brunswick official website
 Curtis Memorial Library
 New Meadows Watershed Partnership

Gallery

 
Populated places established in 1628
Portland metropolitan area, Maine
Towns in Cumberland County, Maine
1628 establishments in the Thirteen Colonies
Towns in Maine
Populated coastal places in Maine